was a Japanese samurai clan.

History

The Nagao clan descend from Taira no Yoshifumi, of the Kammu Heishi (Taira clan), and from the Emperor Kammu (735–806), the 50th Emperor of Japan.

They are one of the 'Bando Hachi Heishi', the 'eight Taira clans of Kanto region' (the Chiba, Miura, Nagao, Kazusa, Doi, Chichibu, Oba, and Kajiwara clans).

The family name of Nagao began when Kagehiro, settled at Nagao no sho estate, in Sagami Province, and took the name of the place. The Nagao were the Kasai (Head retainers) of the Uesugi clan, and were the Shugodai (vice-Governors) of Echigo, Kozuke, and Musashi provinces.

The Kamakura Ashikaga Nagao branch, was called the Kamakura Nagao because they lived in Kamakura. They were also given the Ashikaga Shoguns family 'Historic estate', the Ashikaga estate in Shimotsuke Province, and were lords of Kanno castle. Nagao Masanaga settled in the Koshigeyama area, and was lord of Tatebayashi castle.

The Shirai Nagao branch were Shugodai (vice-Governors) of Kozuke and Musashi provinces and lords of Aomi, Hachigata and Shirai castles.

The Echigo Nagao branch were Shugodai of Echigo province. The clan built and controlled Kasugayama Castle and the surrounding fief, in what is now Niigata Prefecture. Nagao Kagetora, adopted by Uesugi Norimasa, became lord of Kasugayama castle in 1548, taking the name Uesugi Kenshin and effectively becoming the head of the Uesugi clan.

Nagao family members of note
Nagao Tamekage (d. 1536), was the father of Nagao Kagetora (Uesugi Kenshin) and Aya-Gozen.
Nagao Harukage (1509-1553), Uesugi Kenshin's older brother, and successor to his father Nagao Tamekage in 1536.
Uesugi Kenshin (1530-1578), originally Nagao Kagetora, is one of the most famous warlords in Japanese history. 
Aya-Gozen (1524–1609), half-sister of Uesugi Kenshin and mother of Uesugi Kagekatsu.
Nagao Fujikage (dates unknown) fought under Kenshin at the fourth battle of Kawanakajima in 1561.
Lady Shirai (d. 1565) was a retainer of Ashikaga Yoshiteru.

References

Further reading
Frederic, Louis (2002). "Japan Encyclopedia." Cambridge, Massachusetts: Harvard University Press.
Turnbull, Stephen (1998). 'The Samurai Sourcebook'. London: Cassell & Co.

Japanese clans
Taira clan